Jabloň is a village and municipality in Humenné District in the Prešov Region of north-east Slovakia.

History
In historical records, the village was first mentioned in 1405.

Geography
The municipality lies at an altitude of 200 metres and covers an area of 11.862 km².
It has a population of about 450 people.

References

External links
 

Villages and municipalities in Humenné District